The following are the appointments to various Canadian Honours of 2018. Usually, they are announced as part of the New Year and Canada Day celebrations and are published within the Canada Gazette during year. This follows the custom set out within the United Kingdom which publishes its appoints of various British Honours for New Year's and for monarch's official birthday. However, instead of the midyear appointments announced on Victoria Day, the official birthday of the Canadian Monarch, this custom has been transferred with the celebration of Canadian Confederation and the creation of the Order of Canada

However, as the Canada Gazette publishes appointment to various orders, decorations and medal, either Canadian or from Commonwealth and foreign states, this article will reference all Canadians so honoured during the 2018 calendar year.

Provincial and Territorial Honours are not listed within the Canada Gazette, however they are listed within the various publications of each provincial government. Provincial and territorial honours are listed within the page.

The Order of Canada

Companions of the Order of Canada

 The Honourable Thomas Cromwell, C.C. 
 Frank C. Hawthorne, C.C. - This is a promotion within the Order 
 The Honourable Louis LeBel, C.C. 
 Cornelia Hahn Oberlander, C.C., O.B.C.  - This is a promotion within the Order
 Roberta Lynn Bondar, C.C., O.Ont.
 The Right Honourable Beverley McLachlin, P.C., C.C.
 Lorne Michaels, C.C.

Honorary Officer of the Order of Canada
 Neil G. Turok, O.C.

Officers of the Order of Canada

 Paul W. Armstrong, O.C. 
 Sally Armstrong, O.C.
 Michael Anthony Church, O.C.
 May Cohen, O.C.
 François Crépeau, O.C.
 Sophie D’Amours, O.C.
 Elizabeth Ann Eisenhauer, O.C.
 Brigitte Haentjens, O.C.
 Keith Hipel, O.C.
 Carol Hopkins, O.C.
 Sajeev John, O.C.
 Robert Joseph, O.C., O.B.C.
 Louie Kamookak, O.C.
 Raymond Laflamme, O.C.
 Mary Law, O.C.
 Kenneth Lum, O.C.
 Alberto Manguel, O.C.
 Lee Maracle, O.C.
 Émile Martel, O.C.
 Joseph B. Martin, O.C.
 Anne Martin-Matthews, O.C.
 Terence Matthews, O.C.
 Sylvain Moineau, O.C.
 André Parent, O.C., O.Q.
 Rose Patten, O.C.
 Ivan Barry Pless, O.C.- This is a promotion within the Order
 Brian Robertson, O.C.
 R. Kerry Rowe, O.C.
 Michael Sefton, O.C.
 William Shatner, O.C.
 Molly S. Shoichet, O.C., O.Ont.
 David Sinclair, O.C.
 Vianne Timmons, O.C.
 Denis Villeneuve, O.C.
 Janet F. Werker, O.C.
 Christiane Ayotte, O.C.
 The Honourable Perrin Beatty, P.C., O.C.
 Chantal Benoit, O.C.
 Lise Bissonnette, O.C., O.Q.
 Cindy Blackstock, O.C.
 Alain Bouchard, O.C., O.Q.
 Gertrude Bourdon, O.C.
 Gordon Muir Campbell, O.C., O.B.C.
 Matthew Coon Come, O.C.
 Wendy Marion Craig, O.C., O.Ont.
 Suzanne Fortier, O.C.
 Sheila Fraser, O.C.
 Julia Gersovitz, O.C.
 Jane Green, O.C., O.N.L.
 Deanna Hamilton, O.C.
 Patricia Meirion Moore, O.C.
 Louise Nadeau, O.C., C.Q.
 Annette M. O’Connor, O.C.
 Peter Henry St George-Hyslop, O.C.

Members of the Order of Canada

 Allan Andrews, C.M.
 Jann Arden Richards, C.M.
 Mary Pat Armstrong, C.M.
 Marilyn Baillie, C.M.
 Réal Bérard, C.M.
 Harry Bone, C.M.
 Abel Bosum, C.M.
 Jacques Boucher, C.M.
 Mark Breslin, C.M.
 Janine Brodie, C.M.
 Helen Burstyn, C.M.
 Alain Caron, C.M.
 The Honourable Andrée Champagne, P.C., C.M.
 Léonie Couture, C.M., C.Q.
 Martha Crago, C.M.
 David Crate, C.M.
 Elizabeth Cromwell, C.M.
 Marie Yvonne Delorme, C.M.
 Gaston Déry, C.M.
 Jean Pierre Desrosiers, C.M.
 Richard Dicerni, C.M.
 Stephanie Dixon, C.M.
 Joyce Doolittle, C.M.
 Jocelyn Downie, C.M.
 Gérard Duhaime, C.M.
 James Eetoolook, C.M.
 Lynn Factor, C.M.
 Thomas Erskine Feasby, C.M.
 Saul Feldberg, C.M.
 Geoffrey Roy Fernie, C.M.
 Carlo Fidani, C.M.
 Saul Fisher, C.M.
 Peter John Fowler, C.M.
 Oliver Gannon, C.M.
 Howard Vance Gimbel, C.M., A.O.E.
 Martin Gleave, C.M.
 Minnie Grey, C.M., C.Q.
 Curtis Harnett, C.M.
 Norman E. Hébert, C.M.
 Richard Henriquez, C.M.
 John W. Hilborn, C.M.
 Josie Hill, C.M.
 Robert Hogg, C.M.
 Judy Illes, C.M.
 Bruce Kirby, C.M.
 Dale H. Lastman, C.M.
 Jeanette Corbiere Lavell, C.M.
 Joseph Lebovic, C.M.
 Wolf Lebovic, C.M.
 John Lord, C.M.
 Roland François Mahé, C.M., O.M.
 André Maltais, C.M.
 Catherine Anne Martin, C.M.
 Marie Mc Andrew, C.M.
 Karen Rochelle Mock, C.M.
 Raymond Murphy, C.M., O.P.E.I.
 Karim Wade Nasser, C.M., S.O.M.
 Nancy Neamtan, C.M., O.Q.
 Barbara Neis, C.M.
 Michel Noel, C.M., C.Q.
 Harold Walter Orr, C.M.
 Stephen Anderson Otto, C.M.
 Madeleine Paquin, C.M.
 Marcelline Picard, C.M., C.Q.
 Kathleen Isabel Pritchard, C.M.
 Andrew Qappik, C.M.
 Ahmet Fuad Sahin, C.M., O.Ont.
 Beverley Noel Salmon, C.M., O.Ont.
 Frederick Sasakamoose, C.M.
 Judith Sayers, C.M.
 Eric Schloss, C.M.
 Bernard Sherman, C.M.
 Ernest Small, C.M.
 Gregory Smallenberg, C.M.
 Claude Snow, C.M., O.N.B.
 Douglas Stenton, C.M.
 Basil Leo Stewart, C.M.
 Gordon Stobbe, C.M.
 Sylvia Sweeney, C.M.
 Jacob Howard Switzer, C.M.
 Valerie Tryon, C.M.
 Christl Verduyn, C.M.
 John Emment Walsh, C.M.
 Barbara Jean Weihs, C.M.
 David Werklund, C.M., A.O.E.
 Calvin A. White, C.M., O.N.L.
 Andrea Baumann, C.M.
 Mohit Bhandari, C.M.
 Eli Bornstein, C.M., S.O.M.
 Robert Bothwell, C.M.
 Hédi Bouraoui, C.M.
 Beverley Busson, C.M., C.O.M., O.B.C.
 Barry Callaghan, C.M.
 David R. Cameron, C.M.
 John Conly, C.M.
 Francis R. Cook, C.M.
 Thomas d’Aquino, C.M.
 Gary Michael Dault, C.M.
 W. Dale Dauphinee, C.M.
 Marie-Anne Day Walker-Pelletier, C.M.
 Nan-b de Gaspé Beaubien, C.M.
 M. Jamal Deen, C.M.
 Allan Steven Detsky, C.M.
 Agnes Di Leonardi, C.M.
 Peter J. Dillon, C.M.
 Jim Estill, C.M., O.Ont.
 Arthur Fogel, C.M.
 David Glenn Fountain, C.M.
 David Fox, C.M.
 Abraham Fuks, C.M.
 Patricia (Patsy) Gallant, C.M.
 Laurier Gareau, C.M.
 Edward H. Garrard, C.M.
 Jack Gauldie, C.M.
 Nahum Gelber, C.M.
 Jack Douglas Gerrow, C.M.
 The Honourable Ronald D. Ghitter, C.M.
 Lieutenant-Colonel (Retired) Stéphane Grenier, C.M., M.S.C., C.D.
 Mitchell Halperin, C.M.
 Peter Irwin, C.M.
 Beverley K. Jacobs, C.M.
 David Trent Jaeger, C.M.
 Rebecca Jamieson, C.M.
 Virendra K. Jha, C.M.
 K. Wayne Johnston, C.M.
 David I. Kent, C.M.
 Dianne Kipnes, C.M.
 Irving Kipnes, C.M., A.O.E.
 Jack Kitts, C.M.
 Jonathan Klassen, C.M.
 Burton Kramer, C.M., O.Ont.
 Alan Latourelle, C.M.
 Gilles Lavigne, C.M.
 Jean-Pierre Léger, C.M.
 Rhéal Leroux, C.M., O.Ont.
 Paul-André Linteau, C.M., C.Q.
 Jon E. Love, C.M.
 Timothy E. MacDonald, C.M.
 Gabor Maté, C.M.
 Seana McKenna, C.M.
 Bruce McManus, C.M.
 Edmund Metatawabin, C.M.
 Morton S. Minc, C.M.
 David Morley, C.M.
 Frances Olson, C.M.
 Hilary Pearson, C.M.
 Sherry Porter, C.M.
 The Honourable Lucienne Robillard, P.C., C.M.
 Calin Rovinescu, C.M.
 Jean-Claude Savoie, C.M., O.N.B.
 Sharon Sholzberg-Gray, C.M.
 Yvonne Steinert, C.M.
 Veronica Jane Strong-Boag, C.M.
 Mutsumi Takahashi, C.M.
 Bryce Taylor, C.M.
 Mark Thompson, C.M.
 Scott Thornley, C.M.
 Michael J. Tims, C.M.
 Mohamed Lamine Touré, C.M., C.Q.
 Dave Toycen, C.M., O.Ont.
 Aritha van Herk, C.M.
 James Patterson Waddell, C.M.
 Elizabeth Hillman Waterston, C.M., O.Ont.
 Barry Wellar, C.M.
 Marjorie White, C.M., O.B.C.
 Ronald Franklin Williams, C.M.
 Gerald Wood, C.M.
 Yiyan Wu, C.M.

Order of Military Merit

Termination of appointments of the Order of Military Merit
 Master Warrant Officer William Edward Lang, C.D. (Retired)

Commanders of the Order of Military Merit

 Rear-Admiral Darren Carl Hawco, C.M.M., M.S.M., C.D.
 Major-General Jean-Marc Lanthier, C.M.M., M.S.C., M.S.M., C.D. - This is a promotion within the Order
 Major-General Omer Henry Lavoie, C.M.M., M.S.C., C.D. - This is a promotion within the Order
 Major-General Alexander Donald Meinzinger, C.M.M., M.S.M., C.D. - This is a promotion within the Order
 Major-General Michael Norman Rouleau, C.M.M., M.S.C., C.D. - This is a promotion within the Order

Officers of the Order of Military Merit

 Lieutenant-Colonel Joseph Léo Cédric Aspirault, O.M.M., C.D.
 Lieutenant-Colonel Brook Garrett Bangsboll, O.M.M., C.D.
 Lieutenant-Colonel Claire Katherine Bramma, O.M.M., C.D.
 Brigadier-General Joseph Jean Guy Chapdelaine, O.M.M., C.D.
 Lieutenant-Colonel Ryan Glen Deming, O.M.M., C.D.
 Colonel Robert Bernard Dundon, O.M.M., C.D.
 Colonel Iain Stewart Huddleston, O.M.M., C.D.
 Major Trevor Jain, O.M.M., M.S.M., C.D.
 Lieutenant-Colonel Jason Gabriel Langelier, O.M.M., C.D.
 Captain(N) Marie-France Langlois, O.M.M., C.D.
 Colonel Christian Joseph Bernard Mercier, O.M.M., M.S.M., C.D.
 Colonel Joseph John Conrad Mialkowski, O.M.M., M.S.C., C.D.
 Major Richard Andrew Havelock Nicholson, O.M.M., C.D.
 Captain(N) Rebecca Louise Patterson, O.M.M., M.S.M., C.D.
 Colonel Robert Tennant Ritchie, O.M.M., M.S.M., C.D.
 Colonel Marie Diane Josée Robidoux, O.M.M., C.D.
 Captain(N) Christopher Allan Robinson, O.M.M., C.D.
 Lieutenant-Colonel Marcy Ellen Spiers, O.M.M., C.D.
 Commodore Angus Ian Topshee, O.M.M., M.S.M., C.D.
 Lieutenant-Colonel Dallas Jay West, O.M.M., C.D.
 Captain(N) Douglas Michael Charles Young, O.M.M., M.S.M., C.D.

Members of the Order of Military Merit

 Ranger Cyril Abbott, M.M.M., C.D.
 Chief Petty Officer 2nd Class André Lionel Aubry, M.M.M., M.B., C.D.
 Master Warrant Officer Joseph Martin Claude Bédard, M.M.M., M.S.C., C.D.
 Warrant Officer Sean Eldon Benedict, M.M.M., C.D.
 Chief Petty Officer 1st Class Marc Thomas Bertrand, M.M.M., C.D.
 Sergeant Marie Stella Thérèse Geneviève Blouin, M.M.M., C.D.
 Master Warrant Officer Cordell James Herman Boland, M.M.M., C.D.
 Master Warrant Officer Dean Stanley Burgher, M.M.M., C.D.
 Warrant Officer Aaron David Bygrove, M.M.M., M.S.M., C.D.
 Sergeant Marie Rollande Isabelle Caya, M.M.M., C.D.
 Chief Warrant Officer Joseph Guy Alain Richmond Champagne, M.M.M., M.S.M., C.D.
 Warrant Officer Geoffrey Howard Chin, M.M.M., C.D.
 Chief Warrant Officer Claude Rodney Cromwell, M.M.M., C.D.
 Chief Petty Officer 1st Class Robert Raymond DeProy, M.M.M., M.B., C.D.
 Warrant Officer Hugo Dany Deshaye, M.M.M., C.D.
 Warrant Officer Christopher Lee Desjardins, M.M.M., C.D.
 Chief Warrant Officer Sophie Marie Patricia Desjardins, M.M.M., C.D.
 Sergeant Michel Doyon, M.M.M., C.D.
 Master Warrant Officer Francis Stephen Dwyer, M.M.M., C.D.
 Chief Warrant Officer Desmond Michael Flood, M.M.M., C.D.
 Warrant Officer Lorilee Ann Flowers, M.M.M., C.D.
 Warrant Officer Jason Edward Forth, M.M.M., C.D.
 Warrant Officer Robert Glenn Arthur Fox, M.M.M., C.D.
 Master Warrant Officer Terry Hans Fraser, M.M.M., C.D.
 Chief Warrant Officer Leslie Darrell Frowen, M.M.M., C.D.
 Chief Warrant Officer Marie Solange Isabelle Galbrand, M.M.M., C.D.
 Chief Petty Officer 1st Class Bradley Gale, M.M.M., C.D.
 Chief Petty Officer 1st Class Joseph Claude Michel Giguère, M.M.M., C.D.
 Master Warrant Officer Gerrit Ted Gombert, M.M.M., C.D.
 Master Warrant Officer Eileen Elizabeth Hannigan, M.M.M., C.D.
 Sergeant Helen Ruth Hawes, M.M.M., C.D.
 Master Warrant Officer Michael Henry Hawthorn, M.M.M., C.D.
 Master Warrant Officer Ronald Michael James Heffernan, M.M.M., C.D.
 Warrant Officer Christopher Hennebery, M.M.M., C.D.
 Sergeant Lejla Imamovic, M.M.M., C.D.
 Warrant Officer Warren Bradley James, M.M.M., C.D.
 Sergeant Andréanne Lise Micheline Joly, M.M.M., C.D.
 Warrant Officer Penny Christina Kennedy, M.M.M., C.D.
 Chief Warrant William Lloyd King, M.M.M., C.D.
 Chief Warrant Officer Joseph Roger Dominic Lapointe, M.M.M., C.D.
 Chief Warrant Officer Blair William Leahy, M.M.M., C.D.
 Major Marylin Suzanne Lemay, M.M.M., C.D.
 Major Slade Gestur John Lerch, M.M.M., C.D.
 Major James Edward Rene Macinnis, M.M.M., C.D.
 Master Warrant Officer John MacKenzie, M.M.M., C.D.
 Warrant Officer Joseph Dany Martin, M.M.M., C.D.
 Warrant Officer Richard John Martin, M.M.M., C.D.
 Chief Warrant Officer Joseph Serge Masson, M.M.M., C.D.
 Master Warrant Officer Suzanne Joyce McAdam, M.M.M., C.D.
 Warrant Officer James McCarron, M.M.M., C.D.
 Warrant Officer Michael Melvin, M.M.M., C.D.
 Master Warrant Officer Morris Henry McGarrigle, M.M.M., C.D.
 Master Warrant Officer James Allan McKenzie, M.M.M., C.D.
 Sergeant Timothy Charles McLean, M.M.M., C.D.
 Major Jennifer Lynn Morrison, M.M.M., C.D.
 Warrant Officer Rebekah Dawn Neville, M.M.M., C.D.
 Captain Brigitte Noël, M.M.M., C.D.
 Chief Warrant Officer Kelly James Parent, M.M.M., C.D.
 Chief Petty Officer 2nd Class Paul Andrew Joseph Parent, M.M.M., C.D.
 Chief Warrant Officer Joseph Yves Éric Poissant, M.M.M., C.D.
 Master Warrant Officer Leonard Andrew Power, M.M.M., C.D.
 Master Warrant Officer Marie Ginette Isabelle Proulx, M.M.M., C.D.
 Master Warrant Officer David Michael Andrew Ridley, M.M.M., C.D.
 Master Warrant Officer Christopher Allan Rigby, M.M.M., C.D.
 Chief Warrant Officer Joseph André Daniel Royer, M.M.M., C.D.
 Chief Petty Officer 2nd Class Marie Nathalie Isabelle Scalabrini, M.M.M., C.D.
 Petty Officer 1st Class Ginette Suzanne Marie Seguin, M.M.M., C.D.
 Chief Warrant Officer Mark Shannon, M.M.M., C.D.
 Chief Petty Officer 2nd Class Stephen James Sheffar, M.M.M., C.D.
 Major Derek John Sheridan, M.M.M., C.D.
 Lieutenant Martin Simard, M.M.M., C.D.
 Warrant Officer Stephen Alan Slade, M.M.M., C.D.
 Sergeant Roxane St. Michael, M.M.M., C.D.
 Master Warrant Officer Martin Sylvestre, M.M.M., C.D.
 Chief Warrant Officer Michael Brian Talty, M.M.M., C.D.
 Chief Petty Officer 2nd Class Joseph André Steve Turgeon, M.M.M., C.D.
 Warrant Officer Joel Kevin Turnbull, M.M.M., C.D.
 Petty Officer 1st Class Robert Jerome Williams, M.M.M., C.D.

Order of Merit of the Police Forces

Commander of the Order of Merit of the Police Forces

 Commissioner Brenda Lucki, C.O.M. - This is a promotion within the Order

Officers of the Order of Merit of the Police Forces

 Chief Superintendent Jeffrey Joseph Adam, O.O.M.
 Deputy Commissioner Rick Barnum, O.O.M. - This is a promotion within the Order
 Deputy Commissioner Brenda Butterworth-Carr, O.O.M. - This is a promotion within the Order
 Chief Constable Neil Dubord, O.O.M. - This is a promotion within the Order
 Deputy Chief Jacques Duchesneau, O.O.M.
 Assistant Commissioner Barbara A. S. Fleury, O.O.M.
 Chief Kai Liu, O.O.M. - This is a promotion within the Order
 Deputy Director General Yves Morency, O.O.M.
 Chief Murray Cecil Rodd, O.O.M. - This is a promotion within the Order

Members of the Order of Merit of the Police Forces

 Sergeant Chris Amell, M.O.M.
 Inspector Shawna E. Baher, M.O.M.
 Superintendent Marc Maurice Bedard, M.O.M.
 Staff Sergeant Donald Edward Bill, M.O.M.
 Chief Brent Ivan Blackmore, M.O.M.
 Superintendent Edward Boettcher, M.O.M.
 Deputy Director General Sylvain Caron, M.O.M.
 Deputy Chief Kevin A. Chalk, M.O.M.
 Deputy Chief Constable Howard Chow, M.O.M.
 Inspector Gordon Frederick Cobey, M.O.M.
 Staff Sergeant Diane L. Cockle, M.O.M.
 Staff Sergeant Stephen T. Conohan, M.O.M.
 Deputy Chief Paul Cook, M.O.M.
 Chief Superintendent Roseanne DiMarco, M.O.M.
 Staff Sergeant Duncan Edward Dixon, M.O.M.
 Superintendent Steve Eely, M.O.M.
 Chief Superintendent Mark John Fisher, M.O.M.
 Superintendent Marcelle M. Flamand, M.O.M.
 Chief Superintendent Paulette Bernadine Freill, M.O.M.
 Sergeant Luc Gagnon, M.O.M.
 Detective Inspector Shawn W. Glassford, M.O.M.
 Superintendent Marty Lang Kearns, M.O.M.
 Ms. Ann King, M.O.M.
 Inspector Eddie Kramer, M.O.M.
 Chief Superintendent Fernand S. Labelle, M.O.M.
 Chief Paul A. Ladouceur, M.O.M.
 Sergeant Michael B. Lamothe, M.O.M.
 Detective John Phillip Langford, M.O.M.
 Deputy Chief Jeffrey Douglas Littlewood, M.O.M.
 Superintendent Wade Daniel Lymburner, M.O.M.
 Chief Bryan Russell MacCulloch, M.O.M.
 Inspector Robyn Dawn MacEachern, M.O.M.
 Superintendent Paul Mackey, M.O.M.
 Chief David M. MacNeil, M.O.M.
 Constable Tad Kenneth Milmine, M.O.M.
 Inspector Mark D. Mitchell, M.O.M.
 Mr. William Moffat, M.O.M.
 Chief Kent D. Moore, M.O.M.
 Constable Michelle Mosher, M.O.M.
 Superintendent Christopher R. C. Newton, M.O.M.
 Inspector Wayne O. A. Nichols, M.O.M.
 Staff Sergeant Thomas Edward Norton, M.O.M.
 Deputy Chief Satpal Singh Parhar, M.O.M.
 Chief Superintendent Chesley Walter Parsons, M.O.M.
 Director Danny Paterson, M.O.M.
 Ms. Debra Diane Perry, M.O.M.
 Superintendent Lorne Edward Pike, M.O.M.
 Deputy Chief Robert John Gordon Ritchie, M.O.M.
 Superintendent Terrence M. Rocchio, M.O.M.
 Superintendent Manuel Rodrigues, M.O.M.
 Sergeant Nancy Rudback, M.O.M.
 Sergeant Peter Murray Sadler, M.O.M.
 Mr. Peter D. Shipley, M.O.M.
 Inspector Bruce D. Singer, M.O.M.
 Inspector Dan Smith, M.O.M.
 Superintendent Chad M. Tawfik, M.O.M.
 Assistant Commissioner Serge J. J. Therriault, M.O.M.
 Superintendent Mark VanZant, M.O.M.
 Deputy Chief Colin Watson, M.O.M.
 Chief Superintendent Ross Arthur White, M.O.M.
 Superintendent Brenda Young, M.O.M.
 Inspector Charles Young, M.O.M.
 Chief Dwayne Zacharie, M.O.M.

Royal Victorian Order

Commanders of the Royal Victorian Order
 Stephen Gregory Wallace (December 30, 2017)
 Galen Willard Gordon Weston, O.C., O.Ont. (December 30, 2017)

Most Venerable Order of the Hospital of St. John of Jerusalem

Knights and Dames of the Order of St. John
 Brian James Jerome Cole
 The Honourable Nellie Kusugak
 Keith Ernest Perron
 The Honourable Margaret Thom
 Richard MacDowell Dumbrille, C.M.
 His Honour The Honourable Arthur Joseph LeBlanc, O.N.S., Q.C.
 Thomas Craig Wilson
 His Honour The Honourable W. Thomas Molloy, O.C., S.O.M., Q.C., 
 Her Honour The Honourable Antoinette Perry, O.P.E.I.,

Commanders of the Order of St. John
 Roger Hétu, O.M.M., C.D.
 Shirley Ann Philpot
 Warrant Officer Marc Joseph Luc Boucher, M.M.M., C.D. AdeC
 The Honourable George Joseph Furey, Q.C.
 Charles McCormack, Georgetown, Ont.
 Warrant Officer Brent Kenneth Schriner, C.D.
 Scott Thomas Thistle, Paradise, N.L.

Officers of the Order of St. John
 Laurie Anne Anderson
 Lorne Dwight Clifford
 Michelle Elaine Covi Haswell
 Robin Ann Innes
 Patricia Gail Kipp
 Beverly Eileen Lafortune
 Grant Douglas MacDonald
 Gail Louise Bailey, Thunder Bay, Ont.
 N. Joel R. Campbell, Cambridge, Ont.
 Ian Joseph MacIntyre, Halifax, N.S.
 Ian Charles Steingaszner, Snowball, Ont.
 Robin D. Walker, Q.C., Toronto, Ont.

Members of the Order of St. John
 Teresa Jean-Baptiste Barton
 Timothy Bauer
 Sarah Joan Byram
 Irene Catherine Cicero
 Carolyn Kathleen Gosselin
 Lucie Houde
 Master Warrant Officer Stephen Lawrence Kern, C.D.
 Douglas David King
 Lieutenant-Colonel Franz Josef Kirk
 Bryce Sterling Kowalsky
 Saha Alex Maric
 Shawn Ian Mclaren
 Jay Christopher Noden
 Brady Joseph Ronald Poirier
 Janice Lynn Preiss
 Lieutenant Sean Paul Pretty, C.D., R.C.N.
 Benoit Rolland
 Richard Stewart
 Stan Stone
 Peter Alan Thompson
 Thomas Russel Walter
 Salvatore Abbruscato, Niagara Falls, Ont.
 Lieutenant (N) Christopher Russell Abram, Barrie, Ont.
 Mario Ancic, Kensington, P.E.I.
 Elizabeth Barlow, Victoria, B.C.
 Chad Alexander Belanger, Prescott, Ont.
 Martha Anne Cassidy, Yarmouth, N.S.
 Po Kwan Tara Chan, Vancouver, B.C.
 Jason Kin-Loon Cheng, Scarborough, Ont.
 Sergeant Stephen William Damery, Shilo, Man.
 Michel Doré, Montréal, Que.
 Teresa Geary, Brampton, Ont.
 Captain Maxime Hamel, Gatineau, Que.
 Elizabeth Rae Hartley, Nanaimo, B.C.
 Sandra Gail Hastie-Black, Thunder Bay, Ont.
 Sergeant Toni Lynne Hicks, Guelph, Ont.
 Polin Hung, Mississauga, Ont.
 David Jeong, Toronto, Ont.
 Robert Michael Koval, Barrie, Ont.
 Dany Levesque, Laval, Que.
 Judith Leslie Lister, Winnipeg, Man.
 Captain Kerry Mei Mark, Winnipeg, Man.
 Philip Mark, Winnipeg, Man.
 Mary Ellen Francis McQueen, Winnipeg, Man.
 Christina Jewel Motsch, Walkerton, Ont.
 Zachary Robert Roy Parrell, Portugal Cove, N.L.
 Anthony Rodrigo Percival, St. Catharines, Ont.
 Deborah Pethrick, Winnipeg, Man.
 Jeffery Dwayne Pinch, Vaughan, N.S.
 Francine Alida Quinn, North Bay, Ont.
 Anthony Michael Saikali, Halifax, N.S.
 Paul Samuel Semkowich, Aurora, Ont.
 Beth Alberta Smith, Sudbury, Ont.
 Michael Steven Smook, Regina, Sask.
 Paul Joel Snobelen, Brampton, Ont.
 Master Corporal Andrew Stevens, Winnipeg, Man.
 Paige Alyssa Gwynne Van Der Zweep, Winnipeg, Man.
 Philip Ernest Williams, Binbrook, Ont.
 Daniel Alvin Joseph Wilson, C.D., Magnetawan, Ont.

Provincial Honours

National Order of Québec

Officers of the National Order of Québec

 Jean-Pierre Charbonneau, O.Q.
 Paul-André Fortier, O.Q.
 André Gagnon, O.Q.
 Michel Goulet, O.Q.
 Phoebe Greenberg, O.Q.
 Francine Lelièvre, O.Q.
 Louise Mailhot, O.Q.
 Andrée-Lise Méthot, O.Q.
 Pierre Nepveu, O.Q.
 Louis Paquet, O.Q.
 Isabelle Peretz, O.Q.
 Guy Rocher, O.Q.
 Louis Sabourin, O.Q.
 Serge Viau, O.Q.

Knights of the National Order of Québec

 John Bergeron, C.Q.
 Michèle Boisvert, C.Q.
 John Bergeron, C.Q.
 Michèle Boisvert, C.Q.
 Michèle Boulanger-Bussière,  C.Q.
 Chrystine Brouillet, C.Q.
 Xavier Dolan, C.Q.
 Daniel Gélinas, C.Q.
 André Gosselin, C.Q.
 Benoît Huot, C.Q.
 Marcel Kretz, C.Q.
 Paul-André Linteau, C.Q.
 Patrick Paultre, C.Q.
 Lili-Anna Pereša, C.Q.
 Danielle Perreault, C.Q.
 Fred Saad, C.Q.
 Wilson Sanon, C.Q.
 Danielle Sauvage, C.Q.
 Nicolas Steinmetz, C.Q.
 Peter F. Trent, C.Q.
 Lorraine Vaillancourt, C.Q.
 Jean-Pierre Villeneuve, C.Q.

Honorary Knight
Takeya Kaburaki, C.Q.

Saskatchewan Order of Merit

 National Chief Perry Bellegarde, S.O.M.  
 Gail Bowen, S.O.M.  
 Dr. Robert Calder, S.O.M.  
 Maurice Delage, S.O.M.  
 Thelma Pepper, S.O.M.  
 Neil Richards, S.O.M. (1949‐2018) (posthumous)

Order of Ontario

 No appointments in 2018

Order of British Columbia

 George C. Melville
 The Honourable Lance S.G. Finch
 The Honourable David Anderson
 Tracey Herbert
 Carey Newman (Ha-yalth-kingeme)
 Brian Fehr; Domenic Cuccione
 Grand Chief Percy Joe
 Brenda Martens
 Deborah Abbey
 Mary Kitagawa
 Anne Giardini
 Joseph James Arvay
 Andrew Way Yin Joe
 William Millerd
 Brian Minter

Alberta Order of Excellence

 Reg Basken
 Rosella Bjornson
 Wayne Chiu
 k.d. lang
 David Manz
 Sol Rolinger
 Allan Wachowich
 Ralph Young

Order of Prince Edward Island

 Mark Arendz
 Heather Cutcliffe
 Irene Jewell of York

Order of Manitoba

 David T. Barnard
 Michael Patrick Barry Belhumeur
 Jacqueline Blay
 Barbara Bruce
 Sara J. Israels
 Robert T. Kristjanson
 W. H. (Bill) Loewen
 Bernice Marmel
 Robb Nash
 Ken Opaleke
 Grant N. Pierce
 Cheryl Rockman-Greenberg

Order of New Brunswick

 Judy Astle
 Charles Bernard
 Roberta Dugas
 Louise Imbeault
 Gaetan Lanteigne
 Walter John Learning
 James Lockyer, C.D.
 Rebecca “Becca” Schofield, M.S.M.
 Ed and Eke van Oorschot
 Eileen Wallace

Order of Nova Scotia

 Ellie Black, O.N.S.
 John L. Bragg, O.C., O.N.S.
 Dr. Clotilda Douglas-Yakimchuk, C.M., O.N.S., D. Litt.
 Janet F. Kitz (Deceased), O.N.S., M.S.M.
 Patti Ann Melanson (Deceased), O.N.S.
 Wade Holly Smith, O.N.S. (Posthumous)

Order of Newfoundland and Labrador

 Cassandra E. Ivany
 Joseph Butler
 Richard Cashin
 Dr. Lloydetta Quaicoe
 Rev. Arthur G. Elliott
 Kaetlyn Osmond
 John Christopher Pratt
 Odelle Pike
 Darryl Fry
 Paula Dawe

Territorial Honours

Order of Nunavut

 Zacharias Kunuk

Order of the Northwest Territories

 Les Carpenter
 Sharon Firth
 Lillian Elias

Canadian Bravery Decorations

Star of Courage

 Constable Sheldon Rayad Shah
 Constable Philip Sheldon

Medal of Bravery

 Ali Belhis, M.B.
 Matthew Attwell, M.B.
 Stephen Baliski, M.B.
 Dennis Becker, M.B. (posthumous)
 Juan Bergoa, M.B.
 Constable Thomas Broadfoot, M.B.
 Brian Chapman, M.B.
 Janson Chapman, M.B.
 Kevin Chau, M.B.
 Anthony Colabufalo, M.B.
 Jonathan Davidson, M.B.
 Jessica Dicks, M.B.
 Warrant Officer John Dunbar, M.B.
 Brian Duncan, M.B.
 Paul Ehni, M.B.
 Constable Michael Gallagher, M.B.
 James Edward Giles, M.B.
 Christopher Hay, M.B.
 Fire Captain James Bruce Hicks, M.B.
 Angela Irvine, M.B.
 Riza Kasikcogliu, M.B.
 Corporal Alexander Keightley, M.B.
 Constable Daniel King, M.B.
 Sergeant Paul Klassen, M.B.
 Derrick Kozinski, M.B.
 Master Corporal Dale Kurdziel, M.B.
 Christopher Lang, M.B.
 Nelson Langridge, M.B.
 Cole Marshall, M.B.
 Larry Martin, M.B.
 Constable Corey McAllister, M.B.
 John McQuaid, M.B.
 Marcus Middleton, M.B.
 Javier Francisco Morales, M.B.
 Troy Morton, M.B.
 David Nelson, M.B.
 Travis Robbins, M.B.
 Jeffrey Stewart, M.B.
 Master Corporal Shawn Thorn, M.B.
 Francis Underwood, M.B.
 Paul van Doesburg, M.B.
 Shane Watson, M.B.
 Corporal Michel Westelaken, M.B.
 Clark Whitecalf, M.B.
 Derek Grahame Wilson, M.B.
 Travis Wolfe, M,B.
 Glenn Wozniak, M.B.
 Constable Dru Abernethy 
 Marco Berardinucci 
 John Boorsma 
 Volunteer Fire Chief Shawn Porter Carey 
 Guy Carrier 
 Kaden Clouston 
 Owen William Collins 
 Constable Dale Culley 
 Constable Mathieu Daigle 
 Stayton Danylowich 
 Wynden Danylowich 
 Constable Shaun De Granpré, M.B. (This is a second award of the Medal of Bravery)
 Daniel Desrochers 
 Alexandr Diaz-Papkovich 
 Brian Dittmar 
 Constable Eric Dubois 
 Jason Eberley 
 Nourredine Fard 
 Constable Sidney Gaudette 
 Sergeant Gregory John Gerbrandt 
 Constable Fabrice Gevaudan (posthumous) 
 Constable Ryan Gillis 
 Andrew King 
 Constable Guillaume Lapointe 
 Constable Douglas Larche (posthumous) 
 Rémi Lesage 
 Corporal Peter Cyril MacLean 
 Fire Chief A. Brent Marshall 
 Constable Bryan Martell 
 Terry May 
 Ronald Alan Minter 
 Constable Shelly L. Mitchell 
 Bruce Morrison 
 Kenneth Nanooch 
 Samuel Nanooch 
 Constable Robert Nickerson 
 Harry Olivieri 
 Barry Parks (deceased) 
 Steve Prior 
 David Provonost 
 Mark Robinson 
 Constable Dave Ross (posthumous) 
 Michael Rouzes 
 Constable Elmer Russell 
 Constable Leah Russell 
 Shawn Solomon 
 Charles Soop 
 Constable Evan Taylor 
 Mackenzie Vatter-Martineau 
 Michael Wassill (posthumous)
 Constable Erik White
 Taylor White
 Kevin Wiseman
 Corporal Justin Yaassoub

Meritorious Service Decorations

Meritorious Service Cross (Military Division)

 Lieutenant-General Frederick Benjamin Hodges, III, M.S.C. (United States Army)
 Master Corporal John Archer, M.S.C., C.D.
 General Joseph Francis Dunford, Jr., M.S.C. (United States Marine Corps)
 General Lori Jean Robinson, M.S.C. (United States Air Force)
 Commander Todd Bonnar, M.S.C., C.D.

Meritorious Service Cross (Civil Division)

 Allan Ian Aitken, M.S.C.
 Murad Al-Katib, M.S.C.
 Dominic Audet, M.S.C.
 Charlene Frances Belleau, M.S.C.
 Sakchin Bessette, M.S.C.
 Jeremy Bryant, M.S.C.
 Andrée Cazabon, M.S.C.
 Sergeant Alain J. M. Clavet, M.S.C. (retired)
 Daniel Corvec, M.S.C.
 Naheed Dosani, M.S.C.
 André Dudemaine, M.S.C.
 Janice Lucille Eisenhauer, A.O.E., M.S.C.
 Éric Fournier, M.S.C.
 André Gingras, M.S.C.
 Bala Theresa (Angèle) Singareddy Gingras, M.S.C.
 Andrew Hall, M.S.C.
 Alex Harvey, M.S.C.
 Garry Wayne Janz, M.S.C.
 Sandra Laronde, M.S.C.
 Shaun Loney, M.S.C.
 Dawn Madahbee Leach, M.S.C.
 Josephine Mandamin, M.S.C.
 Sean McCormick, M.S.C.
 Ryan W. Bresser Moran, M.S.C.
 Robert Piché, M.S.C.
 Susan Jane Pond, M.S.C.
 Carolyn J. Reicher, M.S.C.
 Kenneth D. Richard, M.S.C.
 Jason Rodi, M.S.C.
 Pierre Thibeault, M.S.C.

Third Award of the Meritorious Service Medal (Military Division)
 Colonel Orest Myroslaw Babij, M.S.M., C.D.

Second Award of the Meritorious Service Medal (Military Division)

 Brigadier-General Shane Brennan, M.S.M., C.D. 
 Captain(N) Jeffrey Hamilton, M.S.M., C.D. 
 Rear-Admiral Darren Carl Hawco, M.S.M., C.D.

Meritorious Service Medal (Military Division)
 Colonel Orest Myroslaw Babij, M.S.M., C.D. 
 Colonel Angela M. Banville, M.S.M., C.D. 
 Master Warrant Officer Andrew Paul Carriere, M.S.M., C.D.
 Brigadier-General Ross Ermel, M.S.M., C.D. 
 Warrant Officer Pierre-Marc Girard, M.S.M., C.D. 
 Commander Andrew Colin Hingston, M.S.M., C.D.
 Lieutenant-Commander Wilfred Douglas Gordon Lund, M.S.M., C.D.
 Brigadier-General Mark Allen Matheson, M.S.M., C.D. (Retired)
 Commander Jeffrey Lawrence Murray, M.S.C., M.S.M., C.D.
 Lieutenant-Colonel Todd Scharlach, M.S.M., C.D.
 Major Anthony Berardinelli, M.S.M., C.D.
 Sergeant James Dalebozik, M.S.M., C.D.
 Chief Warrant Officer David Edward Hepditch, M.M.M., M.S.M., C.D.
 Lieutenant-Colonel Christopher Lionel Robidoux, M.S.M., C.D.
 Lieutenant-Commander Paul Smith, M.S.M., C.D.
 Major Christopher Wood, M.S.M., C.D.
 Warrant Officer Sean Eldon Benedict, M.S.M., C.D.
 Leading Seaman Steven Galloway, M.S.M., C.D.
 Major Tammy Michelle Hiscock, M.S.M., C.D.
 Lieutenant-Colonel Nickolas Roby, M.S.M., C.D.
 Chief Warrant Officer Keith Michael Olstad, M.M.M., M.S.M., C.D.
 Major Carlo Rossi, M.S.M.
 Brigadier-General Brad Sullivan, M.S.M. (United States Air Force)
 Major Michael Veitch, M.S.M., C.D.

Meritorious Service Medal (Civil Division)

 Zenon Petro Andrusyszyn, M.S.M.
 Geneviève Auclair, M.S.M.
 Katelyn Bateman, M.S.M.
 Julie Bélanger Vincent, M.S.M.
 Michelle Marie-Paule Bonneau, M.S.M.
 Mitch Bourbonniere, M.S.M.
 Stella Marguerite Bowles, M.S.M.
 Laurent Brisebois, M.S.M.
 Emilie Bureau, M.S.M.
 Theresa R. Collizza Carriere, M.S.M.
 Michael Redhead Champagne, M.S.M.
 Alan Ojiig Theodore Corbiere, M.S.M.
 Gordon Cressy, O.Ont., M.S.M.
 Augustin Dalton, M.S.M.
 Neil Debassige, M.S.M.
 Jean Duchesneau, M.S.M.
 Paul S. Etherington, M.S.M.
 Mark Etherington, M.S.M.
 Sean Etherington, M.S.M.
 Didier Farré, M.S.M.
 James Favel, M.S.M.
 Kirby D. Fontaine, M.S.M.
 Marie Ann Fontaine, M.S.M.
 Merna Margaret Forster, M.S.M.
 Daniel Gaudet, M.S.M.
 Sydney Adam Goldenberg, M.S.M.
 Althea Guiboche, M.S.M.
 Margaret Louise Hewlett, M.S.M.
 Kyle Hill, M.S.M.
 Waneek Horn-Miller, M.S.M.
 Larry Hundt, M.S.M.
 Lorna Hundt, M.S.M.
 Karen Joseph, M.S.M.
 Marguerite Kazarian, M.S.M.
 Sébastien Lapierre, M.S.M.
 Fred Losani, M.S.M.
 Nathalie Maione, M.S.M.
 Assistant Commissioner Russell B. Mirasty, M.S.M. (retired) 
 Larry James Morrissette, M.S.M. (posthumous)
 Robb Nash, M.S.M.
 Andrea Nemtin, M.S.M.
 Donald Wayne Nicholls, M.S.M.
 Paul Charles Nichols, M.S.M.
 Terry Lee Nichols, M.S.M.
 Jane E. Nokes, M.S.M.
 Allan Mi’kskimmiisoka’simii Pard, M.S.M. (posthumous)
 Mark W. Podlasly, M.S.M.
 Farhat Rehman, M.S.M.
 Diane Louise Roussin, M.S.M.
 Wilson Sanon, M.S.M.
 Becca Schofield, M.S.M.
 Harnarayan Singh, M.S.M.
 Fabien Sinnett, M.S.M.
 John Gordon Stewart, M.S.M.
 Michelle Sullivan, M.S.M.
 Nathan T. Tidridge, M.S.M.
 Bernard Trottier, M.S.M.
 Jennifer Nicole van Wyck, M.S.M.
 Erik Nelson Vu, M.S.M.
 Joseph Y. K. Wong, C.M., M.S.M.
 Leonard Gordon Zebedee, M.S.M.
 Helen Zukerman, M.S.M.

Secret appointments
16 June 2018: Her Excellency the Right Honourable Julie Payette, Governor General and Commander-in-Chief of Canada, on the recommendation of the Chief of the Defence Staff, has awarded seven Meritorious Service Medals to members of the Canadian Armed Forces for military activities of high standard that have brought great honour to the Canadian Armed Forces and to Canada. For security and operational reasons, the names and citations of the recipients have not been released.

Polar Medal

 Christopher Robert Burn
 Norman E. Hallendy
 Jerry Kobalenko
 Carolyn Carroll
 Fay Trombley

Commonwealth and Foreign Orders, Decorations and Medal awarded to Canadians

From Her Majesty The Queen in Right of Australia

Australian Service Medal with Counter Terrorism and Special Recovery Operations Clasp

 Warrant Officer Martin Buisson

Australian Operational Service Medal – Greater Middle East Operation
 Sergeant Ryan Edward Harding

From Her Majesty The Queen in Right of the United Kingdom

Member of the Order of the Companions of Honour

 Ms. Margaret Olwen MacMillan

Commander of the Most Excellent Order of the British Empire

 Mrs. Brenda Dianne Hebb Trenowden

Officer of the Most Excellent Order of the British Empire
 Mr. Terence Hedley Matthews
 Mr. Marshall Charles Bailey

Member of the Most Excellent Order of the British Empire
 Ms. Melinda Mills

Royal Navy Long Service and Good Conduct Medal

 Lieutenant(N) Adam Rees

From the President of the Republic of Austria

Grand Decoration of Honour for Services to the Republic of Austria

 Mr. Renaud Sorieul

From His Majesty The King of the Belgians

Knight of the Order of Leopold

 Mr. Stephen Klimczuk-Massion

From the President of the Federative Republic of Brazil

Grand Officer of the Order of Military Merit
 Lieutenant-General Paul Francis Wynnyk,

Knight of the Order of Military Merit
 Chief Warrant Officer Alain Guimond

Santos-Dumont Merit Medal

 Major Eric Michael Willrich

From the President of Burkina Faso

Knight of the Order of Merit
 Ms. Lucie Coulibaly-Tapsoba
 Mr. Gérard Coulombe
 Ms. Edith Gingras
 Mr. Luc Keita
 Mr. Sawadogo Mahamadou
 Mr. Jean-Paul Ruszkowski
 Mr. Kariyon Robert Somé
 Mr. Souleymane Traoré

From the Government of the Republic of Colombia

Grand Cross of the “José María Córdova” Order of Military Merit

 Lieutenant-General Paul Francis Wynnyk

From the President of the French Republic

Commander of the National Order of the Legion of Honour

 Ms. Helen Vari

Knight of the National Order of the Legion of Honour
 Mr. Mark Hutchings 
 Mr. David Kettle
 Mr. André Levesque
 Mr. Daniel Pauly
 Mr. Clément Duhaime

Grand Officer of the National Order of Merit

 Ms. Antonine Maillet

Knight of the National Order of Merit
 Mr. Yves Tiberghien 
 Ms. Céline Bak
 Brigadier-General Steven Whelan

Officer of the Order of Arts and Letters

 Mr. Piers Handling

Knight of the Order of Arts and Letters
 Mr. Didier Farré
 Ms. Manon Barbeau
 Mr. Daniel Bertolino

Officer of the Order of the Academic Palms

 Mr. Gérald Bennetot-Deveria
 Mr. Charles Romero

Knight of the Order of the Academic Palms

 Mr. Richard Boudreault
 Mr. Richard Clément
 Ms. Edith Dumont
 Ms. Esther Gaudreault
 Mr. Ron Levi
 Ms. Claire Trépanier
 Ms. Catherine Audrain
 Mr. Frédéric Bastien
 Ms. Josette Bouchard-Muller
 Mr. Paul Cohen
 Mr. Jean-Douglas Comeau
 Ms. Patricia Guérin
 Ms. Mirna Hafez
 Mr. Marc Lapprand
 Mr. Jean-Jacques Nattiez
 Mr. Stéphane Nouaillac
 Ms. Valérie Restrepo
 Mr. Sylvain Rousseau-Egele
 Mr. Gilles Savard
 Ms. Annette Viel

Knight of the Order of Agricultural Merit 
 Mr. Frédéric Tandy
 Mr. Claude Zarié

National Defence Medal, Gold Echelon

 Brigadier-General Stephen Richardson Kelsey
 Colonel Cayle Ian Oberwarth

National Defence Medal, Silver Echelon
 Major Timothy William Francis Day

National Defence Medal, Bronze Echelon
 Sub-Lieutenant Antoine Blais

Foreign Affairs Medal of Honour, Bronze Echelon

 Mr. Denis Laroche
 Ms. Béatrice Allaire
 Mr. Yann Beaumelle
 Ms. Mirna Corona
 Ms. Sylvie Lemaire

From the President of the Federal Republic of Germany

Cross of the Order of Merit of the Federal Republic of Germany

 Dr. Ian Simon Fraser
 Dr. Annemarie Hofer
 Mr. David Malcolm Darby
 Dr. Alexander Fried

From His Holiness The Pope of the Holy See

Dame and Knight Commanders of the Order of Pope Saint Sylvester

 Mr. Austin A. Mardon
 Ms. Catherine Mardon

From the President of the Republic of Hungary

Commander’s Cross of the Order of Merit of Hungary (Civil Division)

 Mr. Peter Forbath

Officer’s Cross of the Order of Merit of Hungary (Civil Division)
 Mr. Frank Hasenfratz
 Mr. Istvan Mody

Knight’s Cross of the Order of Merit of Hungary (Civil Division)

 Mr. Miklos Gratzer
 Mr. Gabor Szilasi
 Ms. Andrea Blanar
 Mr. Peter Csermely
 Mr. Leslie Dan Louis
 Mr. Kalman Dreisziger
 Mr. Balazs Jaschko
 Mr. Marton Seregelyes
 Mr. Zoltan Vass

Golden Cross of Merit of Hungary (Civil Division)

 Dr. Laszlo Aladar Jeney

From the President of the Republic of Italy

Knight of the Order of Merit of the Republic of Italy

 Mr. Giuseppe Asaro 
 Mr. Antonino Cuffaro 
 Ms. Marie-Josée Kravis

Knight of the Order of the Star of Italy
 Mr. Jean Charles Viens
 Mr. Nicola Antonio Di Donato

From His Majesty The Emperor of Japan

Order of the Rising Sun, Gold and Silver Star

 Mr. Mike Wallace
 Mr. Rocky Rokuji Oishi

Order of the Rising Sun, Gold Rays with Rosette 
 Mr. Christian D’Orangeville
 Mr. Theodore William Goossen

Order of the Sacred Treasure, Gold and Silver Rays

 
 Ms. Elizabeth van der Wind

From the President of Latvia

Order of Viesturs, First Class

 General Jonathan Holbert Vance, C.M.M., M.S.C., C.D.

Order of Viesturs, Fourth Class
 Lieutenant-Colonel Wade Rutland

Cross of Recognition, Fifth Class
 Mr. Valdis Martins Vagners

From the President of the Republic of Lithuania

Knight’s Cross of the Order for Merits to Lithuania

 Mr. Vladas Petrauskas

From the President of Mongolia

Friendship Medal
 The Honourable Joseph A. Day

From His Majesty The King of the Netherlands

King Willem-Alexander Investiture Medal 2013

 The Right Honourable David Lloyd Johnston,

From the Secretary-General of the North Atlantic Treaty Organization

Meritorious Service Medal

 Lieutenant-Colonel Michael Brian Patrick
 Commander Sheldon Roderick Kyle Gillis
 Lieutenant-Colonel Donald Mulders
 Colonel Jacques Mario Scott O’Keefe

From His Majesty The King of Norway

Officer of the Royal Norwegian Order of Merit

 Mr. Edward Wagner

Norwegian War Medal 
 Mr. Percy Cyril Frost Danby

From the President of Pakistan

Star of Sacrifice 
 Lieutenant-Colonel Mike Voith

From the President of the Republic of Poland

Commander’s Cross with Star of the Order of Merit of the Republic of Poland

 Ms. Irena Cousins
 Mr. Jan Cytowski

Officer’s Cross of the Order of Merit of the Republic of Poland
 Mr. Gunnar Svante Paulsson

Commander’s Cross of the Order of Polonia Restituta

 Mr. Ireneusz Sieranski (posthumous)

Knight’s Cross of the Order of Polonia Restituta 
 Mr. Jozef Palimaka

Cross of the Order of the Cross of Independence
 Ms. Barbara Maria Kryn (posthumous)

Cross of Freedom and Solidarity

 Mr. Ireneusz Sieranski
 Ms. Renata Sierańska
 Mr. Jan Stelmach
 Mr. Herbert Franciszek Rennert
 Mr. Slawomir Sadurski

Siberian Exiles Cross

 Ms. Zofia Kowalska

Long Marital Life Medal

 Mrs. Stanislawa Janusz
 Mr. Zbigniew Janusz

From the President of Portugal

Commander of the Order of Merit of Portugal
 Mr. David Nicodemio Tavares

From His Majesty The King of Spain

Commander of the Order of Civil Merit

 Dr. Andres M. Lozano

From the President of the United States of America

Officer of the Legion of Merit

 Colonel Patrick J. B. Carpentier
 Colonel Daniel S. Constable
 Brigadier-General Dany SSJ Fortin
 Captain (N) Steve Jorgensen

Defence Meritorious Service Medal

 Lieutenant-Commander Michael A. Seed
 Lieutenant-Colonel Daniel Theriault
 Major John R. F. Waugh
 Lieutenant-Colonel Justin P. Boileau
 Major Dave J. S. Kruger
 Major Francesco Messina
 Major James R. Siebring
 Major Jennifer C. Stadnyk
 Major Timothy R. Symington
 Master Warrant Officer Jason J. Yeremiy
 Major Joel D. Levandier

Meritorious Service Medal

 Lieutenant-Colonel Frank K. Ebner
 Lieutenant-Colonel Christopher L. Robidoux
 Sergeant James R. Sceviour
 Major Louis-Philippe Tardif
 Lieutenant-Colonel Kevin J. Brown
 Captain Robert T. Curtis
 Major Philippe-André Genest
 Lieutenant-Colonel Todd W. Harris
 Major Theodore H. Moreau
 Major Michael J. Schultz
 Major Mark G. Wilson
 Major Michael E. Wood
 Superintendent Harvey L. Seddon
 Lieutenant-Colonel David Alan Coker
 Major Mario Joseph Jaques Gregoire
 Colonel Joshua James Major
 Major Cameron W. Meikle
 Captain Rishi Sehgal

Air Medal 

 Warrant Officer Kendell W. Hayward
 Captain Alexandre Ouellet
 Sergeant Daniel J. Publicover
 Warrant Officer Jamie S. Rideout

Erratums of Commonwealth and Foreign Orders, Decorations and Medal awarded to Canadians

03 March 2018

From the President of Finland

Knight of the Order of the Lion of Finland, 1st Class
 Mr. Stephen Timmons

31 March 2018

From the President of the Republic of Italy

Knight of the Order of Merit of the Republic of Italy
 Mr. Giuseppe Asaro
 Mr. Antonino Cuffaro

27 October 2018

From the President of the United States of America

Meritorious Service Medal
 Major Ralf H. Urzinger

References 

Monarchy in Canada
2018 awards in Canada